Batıkan is a common masculine Turkish given name. It is composed of two words: "Batı" and "Kan". In Turkish, "Batı" means "West" whereas "Kan" means "Sovereign", "Ruler" and/or "Blood". Thus, "Batıkan" means "Sovereign of the West", and/or "Ruler of the West".

Real People
 Batıkan Açıkgöz, a Turkish ice hockey player of ABBA SK

Turkish masculine given names